The Cow and The Calf are basalt rock formations off the south coast of Western Australia. They are 26 km south east of Windy Harbour and can be seen from there on a clear day. They are particularly notable for their high abundance of abalone and as a popular destination for both commercial fishing and sports fishing.

See also
Sandy Island (Windy Harbour)
Quagering Island
Chatham Island (Western Australia)

References

South coast of Western Australia